Martine Begue (born 22 December   1969 at St. Benedict) is a former French athlete, who specialised in the Javelin.

Biography  
She won three French national titles in the Javelin in 1989, 1992 and 1993.

In 1993, she set a new French Javelin record with a throw of 64.46m.

prize list  
 French Championships in Athletics   :  
 3 times winner of the javelin in 1989,  1992 and 1993.

Records

notes and references

External links  
  Docathlé2003, French Athletics Federation, 2003 p. 389

1969 births
Living people
French female javelin throwers
21st-century French women
20th-century French women